Paul Peterson (born July 1, 1988) is an American professional golfer, currently playing on the European Tour and the Asian Tour.

Professional career
Peterson played on the Canadian Tour in 2012, making only two cuts in six events. In February 2014, Peterson was successful at the Asian Tour Qualifying School. In 2015, he finished in the top 10 of two joint events with the European Tour. This gave him 138th place in the European Tour rankings for 2015, earning him conditional status for 2016.

On August 21, 2016, Peterson won the D+D Real Czech Masters for his first European Tour victory. He was ranked 398th in the world prior to the victory. In January 2018, Peterson won the Myanmar Open, co-sanctioned by the Asian Tour and the Japan Golf Tour, by two strokes, which moved him up to 127th in the Official World Golf Ranking.

Professional wins (3)

European Tour wins (1)

Japan Golf Tour wins (1)

1Co-sanctioned by the Asian Tour

Asian Tour wins (1)

1Co-sanctioned by the Japan Golf Tour

Other wins (1)
2012 Western Printing Pro-Am at Moccasin Creek (Dakotas Tour)

References

External links

American male golfers
Oregon State Beavers men's golfers
European Tour golfers
Asian Tour golfers
Golfers from Arizona
Left-handed golfers
Sportspeople from Tucson, Arizona
1988 births
Living people